Events from the year 1555 in art.

Events
 Villa Giulia is completed, which now houses the National Etruscan Museum's collection of Etruscan civilization art and artifacts

Paintings
 
 Sofonisba Anguissola - Lucia, Minerva and Europa Anguissola Playing Chess
 Cristofano Gherardi - Transfiguration (Cortona)
 c. 1555 – Titian
 Venus with a Mirror
 Venus and Musician (Museo del Prado's second version)
c.1555  - Paolo Veronese - Venus Disarming Cupid
 c. 1555-1560 – Illuminated tughra of Sultan Suleiman, from Istanbul, Turkey (now in The Metropolitan Museum of Art, New York)

Births
April 21 – Ludovico Carracci, Italian painter  (died 1619)
date unknown
Carlo Antonio Procaccini, Italian painter of still lifes and landscapes (died unknown)
Dong Qichang, Chinese painter, scholar, calligrapher, and art theorist of the later period of the Ming dynasty (died 1636)
Aegidius Sadeler I, Flemish engraver of the Sadeler family (died 1609)
Antonio Tempesta, Florentine painter and engraver, worked in Rome, influenced by Counter-Mannerism (died 1630)
Giovanni Battista Trotti, Italian painter active mainly in his native city of Cremona (died 1612)
probable
Jacob de Backer, Flemish Mannerist painter and draughtsman (died 1585)

Deaths
July 2 - Girolamo dai Libri, Italian illuminator of manuscripts and painter of altarpieces (born 1474/1475)
date unknown
Giovanni Antonio Amato, Italian painter (born 1475)
Barthel Bruyn the Elder, German painter (born 1493)
Niccolò Giolfino, Italian painter (born 1476) 
Gerolamo Giovenone, Italian painter (born c.1486)
probable
(died 1555/1558): Giovanni Francesco Caroto, Italian painter active in Verona (born 1480)
(died 1555/1558): Benedetto Montagna, Italian engraver (born 1481)
(died 1555/1561): Heinrich Aldegrever, German painter and engraver (born 1502)
Herri met de Bles, Flemish Northern Renaissance and Mannerist landscape painter (born 1510)
Jan Mostaert, Dutch painter of portraits and religious subjects (born 1475)
Mir Musavvir, Persian illustrator and painter (born unknown)

References

 
Years of the 16th century in art